Admiral Sir Douglas Eric Holland-Martin,  (10 April 1906 – 6 January 1977) was a Royal Navy officer who served as Second Sea Lord and Chief of Naval Personnel from 1957 to 1959.

Naval career
Educated at West Downs School, Holland-Martin entered the Royal Naval College, Osborne, in 1920. He played cricket for the Royal Navy between 1928 and 1933, including one first-class match against the Royal Air Force at The Oval. He later played a first-class match for the Combined Services cricket team against the touring New Zealanders at Portsmouth in 1937.

On the outbreak of the Second World War, Holland-Martin was executive officer of the destroyer  when his captain was taken ill and he was given the command.

After the war, Holland-Martin became Naval attaché to Argentina, Paraguay and Uruguay. He was appointed captain of the destroyer  in 1949 and then Director of Plans at the Admiralty in 1952. He took command of the aircraft carrier  in 1954 and then became Flag Officer, Flotillas, Mediterranean in 1955.

Holland-Martin was made Second Sea Lord and Chief of Naval Personnel in 1957 and Commander-in-Chief, Mediterranean Fleet and NATO Commander Allied Forces Mediterranean in 1961. His final post was as Commandant of the Imperial Defence College in 1964. He retired in 1966.

Later life
In retirement, Holland-Martin was appointed to the honorary post of Vice-Admiral of the United Kingdom for a term and also served as a Deputy Lieutenant in Hereford and Worcester.

Family
In 1951 Holland-Martin married Rosamund Mary Hornby, daughter of St John Hornby. Rosamund became chairman of the National Society for the Prevention of Cruelty to Children and was appointed a Dame Commander of the Order of the British Empire in 1983 (however, she continued to style herself Lady Holland-Martin, rather than Dame Rosamund). The couple had a son and a daughter.

References

External links

|-

|-

|-

1906 births
1977 deaths
People educated at West Downs School
People educated at the Royal Naval College, Osborne
Knights Grand Cross of the Order of the Bath
Companions of the Distinguished Service Order
Hornby family
Lords of the Admiralty
Recipients of the Distinguished Service Cross (United Kingdom)
Royal Navy admirals
Royal Navy officers of World War II
Lord-Lieutenants of Hereford and Worcester
English cricketers
Royal Navy cricketers
Combined Services cricketers
Military personnel from London